"Stop Being Greedy" is the second single by DMX from his debut studio album. The single peaked at No.79 on the Billboard Hot 100 in the US.

Background
The instrumental was produced by P.K. for Ruff Ryders Entertainment and Dame Grease. The music video for the song was shot in the town of Chester, New York,  and features the old MSB bank and the Glenmere Mansion. The song samples "My Hero Is a Gun" by Diana Ross from the 1975 film Mahogany.

Charts

DMX (rapper) songs
1998 singles
1998 songs
Def Jam Recordings singles
Ruff Ryders Entertainment singles
Hardcore hip hop songs
Horrorcore songs
Songs written by DMX (rapper)
Songs written by Michael Masser